is a Japanese actor.

Biography
Yoshioka's acting career started in 1997, and he played the protagonist Gamu Takayama in Ultraman Gaia from 1998 to 1999. On 2002, Yoshioka was part of a limited tokusatsu actor unit, Hero730. On August 31, 2007, he left Queen's Ave-α. Yoshioka is currently affiliated with 10-Point. He later reprised his role as Gamu Takayama/Ultraman Gaia in the film Superior Ultraman 8 Brothers for the first time in seven years on 2008. On October 10, 2009, Yoshioka announced on his blog that he married Flip-Flap member Aiko. They later divorced on October 10, 2014. On July 4, 2015, Yoshioka later announced in his blog that married Ultraman Mebius actress Misato Hirata.

Filmography

TV series

Films

Stage

References

External links
 

Japanese male actors
1979 births
Living people
People from Shinjuku